Bianca Stéphanie Beauchamp (born October 14, 1977) is a Canadian fetish model best known for her glamour, erotic and latex fetish modelling.

Early life and education 
Beauchamp was born in Montreal, Quebec to a French Canadian father and an Italian mother. She was named after Bianca Jagger. She grew up in Montreal, where she was raised in a low-income neighbourhood. After having difficulty at home, Beauchamp moved away soon after graduating high school, and began a course in French literature at CEGEP, hoping to become a high-school French teacher. Beauchamp managed to pass the entrance exam for an exclusive private school. After achieving her certificate, she began studying French and teaching at Université du Québec à Montréal. 

Bianca is bisexual. Beauchamp met aspiring photographer Martin Perreault at the age of 18. Perreault convinced her to pose for photographs as his muse, and she began modelling for him. Around 1995, then 20-year-old Beauchamp bought her first latex dress, saying later that she loved how latex contours her whole body and how special the material was for her.

Career
After entering latex fetishism in 1998, Beauchamp and Perreault founded the website Latex Lair (now known as ilovebianca.com). The website showcased erotic galleries and erotic filmography of Bianca donning latex clothing, with Martin shooting most of their work. The duo's work eventually built an international recognition in the latex fashion scene. During her teaching internship at Université du Québec à Montréal, one of the staff discovered their website and suggested that she shut it down (although at the time it contained no nudity). Bianca took down the website, but re-opened the site after completing the internship, prompting the university to threaten to fail her if it remained online. Beauchamp realized her passion for fetish modelling outweighed that for teaching, and left university at the age of 23 to pursue her modelling career.

Beauchamp soon appeared in photoshoots for Bizarre, Marquis, Nightlife, Penthouse, Playboy, Skin Two, and Whiplash, while working at McDonald's, a video store, a sex shop and as a strip-club waitress until her fetish modelling career was fully established.

In January 2007, Beauchamp became the first model to appear on the front cover of Bizarre magazine six times, and later in the same year represented Hype Energy at the 2007 Canadian Grand Prix. Her photos have also been in several Playboy Special Edition issues, including the cover of a Book of Lingerie issue. She has also been on the cover of the Playboy Girls of Canada calendar twice. In partnership with her website and Ritual Entertainment, she portrayed the character Elexis Sinclaire for the video game SiN Episodes.

In January 2008, Beauchamp was named 31st in Askmen.com's Top 99 Women of the Year, a popular "Hot List" for celebrities. The following year, she improved her ranking to 24th. In January 2009, she appeared on the cover of Bizarre magazine, her 9th cover for the UK magazine, confirming her lead as the model who appeared the most times on Bizarre.

Books and film
In 2006, Beauchamp released the self-published book Bianca Beauchamp – Fetish Sex Symbol which focuses on her modelling career as a latex fetish model.

In 2007, she released her film Bianca Beauchamp: All Access, a reality-documentary directed and edited by her partner Martin Perreault. The 85-minute film was premiered at Fantasia Film Festival in July 2007 and issued as a 2-disc Special Edition DVD in September 2007. The film was acquired by distributor HALO 8 Entertainment at the Fantasia Festival and was slated for a wide release in North America on January 29, 2008.

In August 2008, Beauchamp premiered Bianca Beauchamp All Access 2: Rubberised at the Montreal Fetish Weekend, with full red carpet treatment and a sold-out theatre. The DVD was released the same day. In 2014, she appeared along with Daniel Baldwin, Ron Jeremy, Michael Madsen, and Malcolm McDowell in the slasher film Lady Psycho Killer.

Personal life

Breast surgery

Soon after deciding to concentrate on modelling, Bianca began a fitness regime in order to stay in shape. This, however, caused her breasts to sag, and she made the decision to undergo breast augmentation surgery, increasing her cup size from a 32C to a 34D. After a year, finding the saline implants unsatisfactory, she underwent surgery a second time, getting slightly bigger silicone implants and increasing her cup size to 32DD. In 2009, Beauchamp went for an additional breast surgery, this time increasing the silicone implants to 800cc and her cup size 32FF. She dismisses criticism about the implants, deeming it hypocritical to applaud people for improving their intellects while condemning them for improving their bodies.

Filmography 
Film

Television

References

External links

 
 
 
 

1977 births
20th-century Canadian women
20th-century Canadian LGBT people
21st-century Canadian actresses
21st-century Canadian LGBT people
Actresses from Montreal
Fetish models
Living people
Female models from Quebec
OnlyFans creators
Canadian female adult models
Bisexual actresses
LGBT models
Canadian bisexual actors
Canadian film actresses
Canadian people of French descent
Canadian people of Italian descent
French Quebecers
Models from Montreal